Broomhill Parish Church, nowadays known as Broomhill Hyndland Parish Church, is a 20th-century church building located in the Broomhill area of Glasgow, Scotland.

History
The church was founded as the Broomhill United Free Church and became Broomhill Parish Church in 1929, after becoming part of the Church of Scotland. It was built using red sandstone church between 1902 and 1905. The church hall was built in 1899. The plans were designed by Stewart & Paterson in the Neo-Gothic cruciform style. A tower was built with a spire in the south west corner. 

In 2017, Hyndland Parish Church was united with Broomhill Parish Church to form Broomhill Hyndland Parish Church, with the Broomhill building serving as the main place of worship.

Works of Arts
The church also includes a number of stained glass windows by Guthrie & Wells, Abbey Studio of Edinburgh and Brian Hutchison. The pipe organ was refurbished by Harrison & Harrison in 1997.

References

Churches completed in 1905
Church of Scotland churches in Glasgow
Listed churches in Glasgow
Category C listed buildings in Glasgow
1902 establishments in Scotland